Associazione Sportiva Dilettantistica Civitavecchia 1920 is an Italian association football club located in Civitavecchia, Lazio. It currently plays in Eccellenza Lazio.

History
It was founded on 1920 as Società Sportiva Civitavecchiese.

A.S.D. Civitavecchia 1920
The historical local club folded in 2005, and restarted again from Terza Categoria, the bottom of the Italian league, with the current name.

On 2007 the club bought the sports title of Unione Sportiva Civitavecchiese, just relegated to Eccellenza Lazio from Serie D, managing to reach promotion to Serie D in their first season.

In 2010–11 season the team played in Eccellenza Lazio A ranking 2nd, but on 5 August 2011 it was admitted to Serie D to fill vacancies.

Colors and badge
The club's colors are black and blue.

References

External links
 Official site

 
Football clubs in Italy
Civitavecchia
Association football clubs established in 1920
Football clubs in Lazio
Sport in the Metropolitan City of Rome Capital
1920 establishments in Italy